Mount Pleasant, Ontario may refer to:

Mount Pleasant, Brampton, Ontario
Mount Pleasant, Brant County, Ontario
Mount Pleasant, Durham County, Ontario
Mount Pleasant, Grey County, Ontario
Mount Pleasant, Hastings County, Ontario
Mount Pleasant, Lanark and Carleton County, Ontario
Mount Pleasant, Lennox and Addington County, Ontario
Mount Pleasant, Perth County, Ontario
Mount Pleasant, Peterborough County, Ontario
Mount Pleasant, Prince Edward District, Canada West (later Prince Edward County)
Mount Pleasant, Waterloo County, Ontario
Mount Pleasant, York Regional Municipality, Ontario (#1), within North Gwillimbury Township
Mount Pleasant, York Regional Municipality, Ontario (#11), another name for Miles Hill, which is now part of Richmond Hill
Mount Pleasant, York Regional Municipality, Ontario (#13)

In Toronto:
 Mount Pleasant Cemetery, Toronto, Ontario
 Mount Pleasant Road, a street in Toronto, Ontario